Vaibhav Shridhar Wategaonkar (born 30 August 1982) is an Indian-born cricketer who plays for the Oman national cricket team. He has played at List A level for Oman in the 2007 ICC World Cricket League Division Two.

Wategaonkar made his debut against Argentina on 24 November 2007, and helped his team to an 18-run victory with 42 and the wicket of Donnie Forrester.
Two matches later, against Namibia, Wategaonkar made his maiden List A century with an unbeaten 114 and became man of the match in a two-wicket Oman win.

He made his Twenty20 International debut for Oman against Hong Kong in the 2016 Asia Cup Qualifier on 19 February 2016.

In January 2018, he was named in Oman's squad for the 2018 ICC World Cricket League Division Two tournament. In August 2018, he was named in Oman's squad for the 2018 Asia Cup Qualifier tournament.

References

External links
 

1982 births
Living people
Omani cricketers
Oman Twenty20 International cricketers
Indian emigrants to Oman
Indian expatriates in Oman
Marathi people
Cricketers from Mumbai